The Sixty-second Amendment of the Constitution of India, officially known as The Constitution (Sixty-second Amendment) Act, 1989, extended the period of reservation of seats for the Scheduled Castes and Scheduled Tribes and representation of the Anglo-Indians in the Lok Sabha and the State Legislative Assemblies for another ten years, i.e. up to 26 January 2000.

Article 334 of the Constitution had originally required the reservation of seats to cease in 1960, but this was extended to 1970 by the 8th Amendment. The period of reservation was extended to 1980 and 1990 by the 23rd and 45th Amendments respectively. The 62nd Amendment extended the period of reservation to 2000. The period of reservation was further extended to 2010, 2020 and 2030 by the 79th and 95th and 104th Amendments respectively.

Text

The full text of Article 334 of the Constitution, after the 62nd Amendment, is given below:

Proposal and enactment
The Constitution (Sixty-second Amendment) Bill, 1989 (Bill No. 26 of 1989) was introduced in the Rajya Sabha on 20 December 1989. It was introduced by Ram Vilas Paswan, then Minister of Labour and Welfare, and sought to amend article 334 of the Constitution relating to reservation of seats for the Scheduled Castes and the Scheduled Tribes and special representation of the Anglo-Indian community in the House of the People and in the Legislative Assemblies of the States. The full text of the Statement of Objects and Reasons appended to the bill is given below:

The Bill was debated by the Rajya Sabha on 21 December, and passed on the same day. It was then considered by the Lok Sabha on 22 and 26 December, and was passed on 26 December 1989. The bill, after ratification by the States, received assent from then President K. R. Narayanan on 25 January 1990, and was notified in The Gazette of India on the same date. It retroactively came into effect on the date on which the Bill for this amendment Act was introduced in the Rajya Sabha (i.e., 20 December 1989).

Ratification
The Act was passed in accordance with the provisions of Article 368 of the Constitution, and was ratified by more than half of the State Legislatures, as required under Clause (2) of the said article. State Legislatures that ratified the amendment are listed below:

 Andhra Pradesh
 Gujarat
 Haryana
 Himachal Pradesh
 Karnataka
 Kerala
 Meghalaya
 Mizoram
 Nagaland
 Orissa
 Rajasthan
 Sikkim
 Tamil Nadu
 Uttar Pradesh
 West Bengal

Did not ratify:
 Arunachal Pradesh
 Assam
 Bihar
 Goa
 Jammu and Kashmir
 Madhya Pradesh
 Maharashtra
 Manipur
 Punjab
 Tripura

See also
List of amendments of the Constitution of India

References

62
1989 in India
1989 in law
V. P. Singh administration